The list of ship launches in 1959 includes a chronological list of all ships launched in 1959.


References

1959
 
1959 in transport